Fleiss is a German surname meaning "diligence". Notable people with the surname include:

Alexander Fleiss, Mathematician, American co-founder of Rebellion Research, a machine learning think tank, robo advisor & hedge fund
Elein Fleiss, French editor-in-chief of Purple Journal
Heidi Fleiss (born 1965), American former madam
Jennifer Fleiss, American fashion executive
Joseph L. Fleiss (1937–2003), American professor of biostatistics
Laura Kaeppeler-Fleiss (born 1988), American beauty pageant winner
Mike Fleiss (born 1964), American television producer
Nika Fleiss (born 1984), Croatian former skier
Noah Fleiss (born 1984), American actor
Paul M. Fleiss (1933–2014), American pediatrician

See also
Fleiss' kappa, a statistical measure of inter-rater reliability

German-language surnames